Graz-Karlau Prison is located in Gries, the 5th district of the city of Graz, capital of the Austrian state of Styria. With a capacity of 552 inmates, Graz-Karlau is the third-largest prison in Austria.

History
Built between 1584 and 1590 in late Renaissance style to designs by Antonio Tade and Antonio Marmoro, it was used as a summer hunting residence for Archduke Karl II of Austria.

Originally, it was called "Dobel Castle". The German word "Dobel" is also written "Tobel", a deep, ravine-like valley or can also be a place and field-name. Because the castle's name was similar to the nearby "Tobel hunting-lodge" situated in Haselsdorf-Tobelbad, it was renamed as "Karlau", after the archduke.

From 1769 it was used as a workhouse and in 1794 started to keep French prisoners of war. In 1803, it became a provincial prison for inmates who had sentences of up to 10 years of imprisonment. In 1847 to 1848 and from 1869 to 1872, it was greatly enlarged. Toward the end of World War II the prison was bombed twice, which killed 14 guards and 107 prisoners. In 1946, the British executioner Albert Pierrepoint travelled to Karlau to train an Austrian executioner and two assistants in the British method of long drop executions. Until then, condemned prisoners were hanged with short drops, effectively strangling them to death. Under the British method, Pierrepoint, the Austrian executioner and the two assistants hanged eight young men on September 24, 1946. 
A method which was continued until Austria abolished capital punishment on June 30, 1950.
The prison was renamed Graz-Karlau on November 1, 1993.

Notable inmates
Among the prison's inmates, it houses or housed prisoners such as the serial killer Jack Unterweger; the letter and pipe bomb terrorist Franz Fuchs; the six-time murderer Udo Proksch; the suspected serial killer Wolfgang Ott; and the terrorist Tawfik Ben Chaovali, who was involved in the Rome and Vienna airport attacks.

References

Prisons in Austria
Buildings and structures in Graz